High Street was a tram stop on Greater Manchester's light rail Metrolink network, located in Manchester city centre, England. It was on the east side of High Street opposite Manchester Arndale, between the present Shudehill tram stop and Market Street tram stop.

The stop opened on 27 April 1992. Market Street (which opened the same day, and was just around the corner) and High Street Metrolink stops effectively formed a single station staggered across a road junction, with different stop names for each platform: southbound vehicles (going towards Piccadilly Gardens and St Peter's Square) stopped at the High Street stop, and northbound vehicles (going towards Victoria) stopped at Market Street.  High Street, Market Street and Mosley Street tram stops were each originally built with a single-platform construction and one-way operation due to constraints on available space in the road layout.

Market Street was modified to handle traffic in both directions when the street was closed to traffic, and the High Street platform was demolished in 1998 after six years' service.

Notes

References

Disused Manchester Metrolink tram stops
Railway stations in Great Britain opened in 1992
Railway stations in Great Britain closed in 1998